John Joseph McGillen (August 6, 1917 – August 11, 1987) was an American professional baseball pitcher. He appeared in two games in Major League Baseball for the Philadelphia Athletics during the 1944 season.

References

1917 births
1987 deaths
People from Eddystone, Pennsylvania
Major League Baseball pitchers
Philadelphia Athletics players
Fulton Tigers players
Lancaster Red Roses players
Milwaukee Brewers (minor league) players
Baseball players from Pennsylvania